Bicyclus hyperanthus, or Bethune-Baker's bush brown, is a butterfly in the family Nymphalidae. It is found in Ivory Coast, eastern Nigeria, Cameroon, the Democratic Republic of the Congo, western Uganda and north-western Tanzania. The habitat consists of sub-montane forests.

References

Elymniini
Butterflies described in 1908